Messon was a town of ancient Lesbos, containing a noted temple. The archaeological site is open to the public.

The site of Messon is located near modern Messa.

References

Populated places in the ancient Aegean islands
Former populated places in Greece
Ancient Lesbos
Tourist attractions in Greece
Ancient Greek archaeological sites in Greece